Riders of the Santa Fe is a 1944 American Western film directed by Wallace Fox and written by Ande Lamb. The film stars Rod Cameron, Fuzzy Knight, Eddie Dew, Jennifer Holt, Ray Whitley and Lane Chandler. The film was released on November 10, 1944, by Universal Pictures.

Plot

Cast        
Rod Cameron as Matt Conway
Fuzzy Knight as Bullseye Johnson
Eddie Dew as Larry Anderson
Jennifer Holt as Carla Anderson
Ray Whitley as Hank
Lane Chandler as Earl Duncan 
Earle Hodgins as Ed Milton 
George Douglas as Tom Benner
Richard Alexander as Biff McCauley 
Budd Buster as Otis Wade
Ida Moore as Luella Tucker

References

External links
 

1944 films
American Western (genre) films
1944 Western (genre) films
Universal Pictures films
Films directed by Wallace Fox
American black-and-white films
1940s English-language films
1940s American films